The 209th Division(2nd Formation) was created in April 1949 from several independent&garrison regiments.

The division was then composed of 625th, 626th and 627th Infantry Regiments.

In October 1950 the division was inactivated and converted to 3rd Pursuit Brigade(), later 3rd Aviation Division of the PLAAF.

References

中国人民解放军各步兵师沿革, http://blog.sina.com.cn/s/blog_a3f74a990101cp1q.html

Infantry divisions of the People's Liberation Army
Military units and formations established in 1949
Military units and formations disestablished in 1950